Polygonum cognatum, commonly called Indian knotgrass or madimak (from Turkish madımak), is an edible  weedy creeping perennial herb in the genus Polygonum, frequently eaten by people of Turkey. It has larger leaves than most other species of Polygonum.

Description 
Polygonum cognatum is a perennial, prostrate or ascending branched herb, 15–30 cm long with a thick stout root stock. Stems are prostrate, green like the leaves. Leaves oblong-elliptic, petiolate, often slightly mucronate. Flowers in bundles in the leaf axils. Perianth pinkish, 4–5 mm, hardening and accrescent in fruit. Nut glossy, included in the perianth.

Habitat 
Irano-Turanian Region or Iran-Turan Plant Geography Region element, grows between 760–5600 meters elevation on rocky and drier slopes; distribution: Central to Western Asia, Turkey, Caucasia (Georgia), Iran, Afghanistan and Pakistan. The madimak is a weed found in both agricultural and non-agricultural areas.

Subspecies 
Polygonum cognatum subsp. chitralicum (syn: P. chitralicum): endemic in Chitral, Pakistan.
Polygonum cognatum subsp. cognatum  (syn: P. cognatum var. alpestre, P. confertum, P. ammanioides, P. pamiroalaicum)

Cuisine 
The madimak is one of the widely known traditional edible plants in Turkey particularly Central Anatolia Region.  To be able compensate increasing demand easily and supply the plant to the markets, farmers started cultivating madimak in Central Anatolia.

Pharmacology 
The highest antioxidant activity was found in the water extract.

References

cognatum
Flora of Turkey
Flora of Georgia (country)
Flora of Syria
Flora of Iran
Flora of Pakistan
Plants described in 1826
Edible plants
Taxa named by Carl Meissner